God of River Lok is a Hong Kong television series produced by TVB. Set in the Three Kingdoms period, the story is about the romance between Zhen Fu (Cantonese: Yan Fuk) and Cao Zhi (Cantonese: Cho Chik). The series has seven episodes, each roughly 60 minutes long. It was first aired in Hong Kong on TVB Jade on 30 March 1975.

Cast
 Note: Some of the characters' names are in Cantonese romanisation.

 Miu Kam-fung as Yan Fuk
 Adam Cheng as Cho Chik
 Leung Tin as Cho Pei
 Chan Yau-hau as Cho Cho
 Kam Hing-yin as Cho Cheung
 Wong Man-lei as Lady Bin
 Cheng Tze-tuen as Ng Jat
 Yuen Ling-to as Cho Kim-fai
 Leung Chau-mei as Tsui Fa
 Chan Kei as Yau-sim
 Kwan Chung as Yeung Sau
 Chow Kat as Tsui Yim
 Tam Chuen-hing as Hui Chu
 Poon Sin-kei as Wong Tsan
 Ching Hor-wai as Lady Tsui
 Ng Man-tat as Ting Yi
 Ng Man-ka as Lau Jing
 Chow Yun-fat as Tsui Fong
 Wong Sun as Sze-ma Yi
 Lam Ka-yi as imperial physician
 Lau Kam-kwan as ceremonial official

See also
 Where the Legend Begins
 List of media adaptations of Romance of the Three Kingdoms

1970s Hong Kong television series
1975 Hong Kong television series debuts
1975 Hong Kong television series endings
TVB dramas
Television series set in the Three Kingdoms
Works based on Romance of the Three Kingdoms
Cantonese-language television shows
1970s romance television series